Zita Gebora (born 18 November 1982) is a Hungarian former ice dancer. With András Visontai, she is the 2000 Golden Spin of Zagreb champion and a three-time Hungarian national champion. They competed in the final segment at nine ISU Championships – three World Championships (2000–2002), three European Championships (2000–2002), and three World Junior Championships (1997–1999).

Gebora/Visontai won two silver medals during the 1997–98 ISU Junior Series and qualified to the final, where they placed fourth. After moving up to the senior level, they appeared at two Grand Prix events. They trained under Ilona Berecz in Budapest.

After her retirement from ice dancing she started to play ice hockey in 2003 as a player of FTC Amazonok later FTC Stars.

She became a two time Hungarian champion with the team. She attended four IIHF World Woman Champiohnship (D3) between 2003 and 2008 and participated four seasons in EWHL.(2004-2008)

Then she ended her player career and became an ice hockey referee. She officiated from 2013 to 2019. In 2019 she were a lines-man in Obihiro, Japan at the IIHF U18 Worlds Woman Championship Top Division.

Programs 
(with Visontai)

Competitive highlights 
GP: Grand Prix; JGP: Junior Series / Junior Grand Prix

With Visontai

With Balika

References

External links
 

1982 births
Living people
European Women's Hockey League players
Figure skaters from Budapest
Hungarian female ice dancers
Hungarian women's ice hockey defencemen
Ice hockey officials
Ice hockey people from Budapest